The Sart mine is a gold mine in Turkey. The mine is operated by the Turkish conglomerate POMZA EXPORT. The mine is located in Salihli of Manisa Province in western Turkey. It is detected that there are 1,9 tonnes of gold in the mine.

References 

Gold mines in Turkey
Buildings and structures in Gümüşhane Province